Everybody, Sing! is a Philippine musical game show created, developed, produced and distributed by ABS-CBN Entertainment.  Hosted by Vice Ganda, it premiered on June 5, 2021, replacing the third season of Your Face Sounds Familiar. The first season concluded on October 10, 2021, and was replaced by Pinoy Big Brother: Kumunity Season 10. The show returned for its second season on September 24, 2022, replacing the second season of Idol Philippines. The show concluded on February 19, 2023, and was replaced by the fifth season of The Voice Kids.

The game show features several community groups, which consists of 50 individuals each, where they are asked to complete a line of a song in order for them to receive cash prizes, and a chance to share a winning jackpot of ₱1,000,000.

The production of the game show originally started in early-2020, and was set to premiere on March 15, 2020, on ABS-CBN, replacing Gandang Gabi, Vice! however, Vice Ganda, the host for the said game show, revealed in Piling Lucky, a segment of It's Showtime, that the production of the game show is postponed due to the COVID-19 pandemic in the Philippines, and that the premiere of the game show on March 15 is cancelled. Reruns of Gandang Gabi, Vice! temporarily filled in the network's programming until the network's shutdown on May 5, 2020, due to the cease-and-desist order by the National Telecommunications Commission, after the network's legislative franchise have lapsed.

Gameplay 
Before the show was pre-empted, there can be 100 individuals in a community group, and a community group can win as much as ₱2,000,000, to be shared by everyone. Due to the COVID-19 pandemic in the Philippines and ABS-CBN's franchise renewal controversy, numerous changes were implemented.

A community group consisting of 50 individuals with ages ranging from 18-59, dubbed as the "Songbayanan," will be divided equally into five rows, whose each row is referred to as "SONGpu". Each round, one row will be chosen by the "ChooSera" to play a particular game (includes "Sing in the Blank", "A-B-Sing", "PicSing a Broken Song", "EngliSing ang Lyrics", "TagaliSing", "The ChooSing One", "AYU-Sing Mo", "ReverSing", "LipSing", and the new minigame "Singko Segundo Challenge"). Each game has a different set of mechanics; However, they have the same goal, each contestant has one attempt to complete a line of a song, they will receive ₱1,000 for each correct guess, and the community group gets an additional 2–4 seconds to the Jackpot round's timer, the more correct guesses, the more chances of winning the Jackpot prize. The community group will then get to participate in the Jackpot round ("Everybody GuesSing"), wherein the community group will be naming each song that is being played. If they name all 10 songs, they can share the winning jackpot of ₱1,000,000.

Sing in the Blank 
This is the first game played in Everybody, Sing. The objective of the minigame is to "sing in the blank" by singing the missing lyrics. The melody (or the way you sing) won't affect your answer, just sing the correct lyrics of the song! Each correct answer is worth ₱1,000 and 2 seconds to the Jackpot timer.

(25 players) The chosen SingKo (a set of 5 players) will play this game. The resident band will start playing the song. From time to time, the song will stop for a moment for them to sing the missing lyrics. Each SingKo has a limit of 3 seconds to sing the missing lyrics in the blank. Each correct answer the SingKo player gives is worth 2 seconds to the Jackpot timer and ₱1,000. If ever the SingKo player has failed to complete the missing lyrics, the line will be skipped, and the next player must guess the next line. The five players will keep "singing in the blank" until they have used their two attempts.

(50 players) The first set of 10 players (aka SONGpu) will play this game. The resident band will start playing the song. From time to time, the song will stop for a moment for them to sing the missing lyrics. Each SONGpu has a limit of 3 seconds to sing the missing lyrics in the blank. Each correct answer the SONGpu player gives is worth 2 seconds to the Jackpot timer and ₱1,000. Each player has one attempt only to "sing in the blank".

(100 players) In the 100 Songbayanan Special, two rows will play Sing in the Blank. The first SONGpu will play the first round, while the second SONGpu will play the second round. As always, the resident band will start playing the song. From time to time, the song will stop for a moment for them to sing the missing lyrics. Each SONGpu has a limit of 3 seconds to sing the missing lyrics in the blank. Each correct answer the SONGpu player gives is equivalent to 1 second to the Jackpot timer and ₱1,000. Each player has one attempt only to "sing in the blank".

PicSing a Broken Song 
This game is played after "Sing in the Blank". The goal to this game is to "fix" a "broken song" by using the picture clues flashed on the screen to collect extra time for the jackpot round. Each correct answer is equivalent to 2 jackpot seconds and ₱1,000.

(25 players) The chosen SingKo will participate in this game and the resident band will start playing the song. For a short period of time, the song will stop for a moment once a picture clue flashed on the screen. The goal of the five players must "fix" the "broken song" to collect and contribute 2 seconds for the Jackpot round and receive ₱1,000. Otherwise, the line will be skipped and the next player must guess the next line. This will continue until all of the players has used their two attempts.

(50 players) The chosen SONGpu will participate in this game and the resident band will begin playing the song. Time after time, the song will stop for a moment once a picture clue flashed on the screen. Each player has one attempt only, or they won't contribute 2 seconds to the Jackpot timer and receive ₱1,000.

(100 players) Two sets of 10 players will play this game. For a short period of time, the song will stop for a moment once a picture clue flashed on the screen. The goal of the five players must "fix" the "broken song" to collect and contribute 2 seconds for the Jackpot round and receive ₱1,000. Otherwise, the line will be skipped and the next player must guess the next line.

A-B-Sing 
The second season of Everybody, Sing! featured two new minigames, including this one called "A-B-Sing". The new minigame was first played at the "50 Funeral & Cemetery Workers" episode last October 29, 2022 as a substitute from "PicSing a Broken Song", where they have to sing the complete lyrics by using the picture clues shown on the screen. The mechanics of this new minigame is simple. The 10 players must guess the missing word by making use of the first letter of the missing lyrics. The clue depends on how many syllables are needed to complete the missing word. For example, if the missing lyric is "singing", then the resident band will sing "S-S" as the clue.

(50 players) The next group of 10 players will play this game, then the resident band will begin playing the song. The song will stop for a moment for them to guess the correct, exact lyrics. Each SONGpu has a limited time of 3 seconds to guess the correct lyrics. If ever the SONGpu player has failed to guess the correct lyrics, the line will be skipped, and the next player must guess the next line. Each correct answer the SONGpu player gives is worth 2 seconds to the Jackpot timer and ₱1,000.

EngliSing ang Lyrics 
This is a translation game where the chosen group will convert Tagalog words into English ones. The song played by the resident band will be in the English language. Each correct answer is worth 2 seconds to the Jackpot timer and ₱1,000.

(25 players) The selected SingKo will play this game, then the resident band will start playing the song. For a short period of time, the song will pause to translate Tagalog words into English ones. Each player has a time limit of 3 seconds to guess the correct translation of the Tagalog word. Otherwise, the player won't get 2 seconds to the Jackpot timer and receive ₱1,000. The line will be skipped then the next SingKo must guess the next line. This will continue until all of the players have used their two attempts.

(50 players) The selected SONGpu will play this game, and the resident band will start playing the song. The song will pause for a moment to give the attempt for the player to translate the Tagalog words into English ones within 3 seconds. Otherwise, the player won't receive ₱1,000 and contribute 2 seconds to the Jackpot timer. Each player has one try only.

(100 players) Two rows of SONGpu will participate in playing this game one row at a time. The resident band will begin playing the song. The song will pause for a moment to give the attempt for the player to translate the Tagalog words into English ones within 3 seconds. Otherwise, the player won't receive ₱1,000 and contribute 2 seconds to the Jackpot timer. Each player has one try only.

TagaliSing 
This translation game is the opposite of EngliSing ang Lyrics, where the selected row must translate the English words into Tagalog ones. The song played by the resident band will be in Tagalog language.

(25 players) The selected SingKo will play this game. The resident band will play the song and pause for a short period of time to allow the player to convert the English lyrics to Tagalog ones. Each correct answer is worth 2 seconds to the Jackpot timer and ₱1,000. This will continue until the players have used their two attempts.

(50 players) The selected SONGpu will play this game. The resident band will play the song and pause for a short period of time to allow the player to convert the English lyrics to Tagalog ones. Each correct answer is worth 2 seconds to the Jackpot timer and ₱1,000.

Vice Sing Ganda 
This minigame is dedicated for viewers at home. Vice Ganda will ask a question related either to the costume he's wearing or related to the Songbayanan. There will be two options given to them. To answer, the viewers at home must post on Twitter with the following: Vice Sing Ganda <letter of answer> #EverybodySingHashtagofTheDay to win ₱5,000. The hashtag is shown on the lower-left of your TV screen.

The ChooSing One 
This next game is choosing the correct set of lyrics. There will be two choices; One is right, one is wrong. Each correct answer is equivalent to 2 seconds to the Jackpot timer and ₱1,000.

(25 players) The chosen SingKo will participate in playing this game. The resident band will play the song, as always. However, the resident band will sing two versions of the lyrics; One's correct, one's not. Each correct answer is equal to 2 seconds to the Jackpot timer and ₱1,000. If a player fails to give the correct set of lyrics in 3 seconds, the line will be skipped and the next player must choose the next correct set of lyrics. This will continue until the players used their two guesses.

(50 players) The chosen SONGpu will participate in playing this game. The resident band will play the song, as always. However, the resident band will sing two versions of the lyrics; One's correct, one's not. Each correct answer is equal to 2 seconds to the Jackpot timer and ₱1,000. If a player fails to give the correct set of lyrics in 3 seconds, the line will be skipped and the next player must choose the next correct set of lyrics.

(100 players) The two selected groups of SONGpu will play this game. The resident band will play the song, as always. However, the resident band will sing two versions of the lyrics; One's correct, one's not. Each correct answer is equal to 1 second to the Jackpot timer and ₱1,000. If a player fails to give the correct set of lyrics in 3 seconds, the line will be skipped and the next player must choose the next correct set of lyrics.

ReverSing 
This game is about transposing a reversed lyrics to its correct position. It is usually the last game to be played by a row before proceeding to the jackpot round called "Everybody GuesSing?".

(25 players) The last selected SingKo will play this game, and the resident band will play the song. As a clue, the resident band will sing the lyrics in reverse. Their only duty in this game is to transpose the reversed lyrics to its original state. Again, each player has 3 seconds to answer. Each correct answer is equivalent to 4 seconds and ₱1,000. However, if the player fails to give the correct lyrics, the line will be forbidden and the next player will transpose the next reversed lyrics. This will continue until the players have used their two guesses.

(50 players) The last selected SingKo will play this game, and the resident band will play the song. As a clue, the resident band will sing the lyrics in reverse. Their only duty in this game is to transpose the reversed lyrics to its original state. Again, each player has 3 seconds to answer. Each correct answer is equivalent to 4 seconds and ₱1,000. However, if the player fails to give the correct lyrics, the line will be forbidden and the next player will transpose the next reversed lyrics.

(100 players) The last two groups of SONGpu will play this game, and the resident band will play the song. As a clue, the resident band will sing the lyrics in reverse. Their only duty in this game is to transpose the reversed lyrics to its original state. Again, each player has 3 seconds to answer. Each correct answer is equivalent to 2 seconds and ₱1,000. However, if the player fails to give the correct lyrics, the line will be forbidden and the next player will transpose the next reversed lyrics.

LipSing 
LipSing is a minigame where players must give the exact lyrics by watching a muted video clip of a lip speaking the correct lyrics. It was introduced in the "25 Street Vendors" episode on the first season of Everybody, Sing! last July 24, 2021.

(25 players) The last SingKo chosen will play this game and the resident band will play the song. However, the song pauses for a moment when a muted video of a lip speaking flashes on the screen. Each correct answer is 4 seconds and ₱1,000. If a player fails to give the correct order of the lyrics in 3 seconds, the line will be skipped and the next player must guess the correct lyrics by the muted video of the lip.

AYU-Sing Mo 
Ayu-SING Mo is a new minigame from the second season of Everybody, Sing! where they have to fix the correct sequence of the four jumbled lyrics. This minigame is the alternative for the ReverSing segment and was featured at the "50 Funeral & Cemetery Workers" episode last October 29, 2022.

(50 players) The last SONGpu will play this game, then the resident band will play the song. Their only objective in this game is to put the lyrics in the correct sequence. Each correct order of lyrics is equivalent to 4 seconds and ₱1,000. If a player fails to give the correct order of the lyrics in 3 seconds, the line will be skipped and the next player must arrange the next set of lyrics.

Singko Segundo Challenge 
The second season of Everybody, Sing! introduced a new minigame called the Singko Segundo Challenge that will be played before Everybody GuesSing?, the jackpot round. In this challenge, the Songbayanan has the opportunity to add 5 seconds to their jackpot timer.

Once all the groups have played, the Songbayanan will choose a representative (dubbed as the Repre-SING-tative) for the pre-jackpot round. Once the community group has chosen their representative, the chosen one will guess the song sang by Vice Ganda himself by only using a relevant word on the Songbayanan. For example, if the Songbayanan are Beauticians, then the word that Vice will sing is kilay. Vice Ganda will give the signal to answer once he's done singing the tune of the song.

Everybody GuesSing? 

After five games, the Songbayanan will play the jackpot round called "Everybody GuesSing?", where they have to guess 10 song titles (usually OPM) in order to win the jackpot prize. The time they'll be using will be the jackpot seconds earned by the five/ten rows together from the introductory games before.

(25 players) Their earned time will start ticking down once the first song is being played by the resident band. Their goal in this final game is to win the jackpot round. Anybody from the 25 players are allowed to answer one time only. Once they have touched their individual buzzer to respond, they are unable to do so again. Each correct guess is worth ₱5,000. The basis for their take-home prize will be multiplied to the number of their correct answers. Example, if the Songbayanan had guessed 8 correct song titles, they'll take home ₱40,000, with each player taking home ₱1,600. However, if the player's guess is wrong, then the players can guess the songs again only if there's sufficient time left. The game's over under the following circumstances: All of the players have used their attempt, or there's no more time remaining. Even so, if they guessed the 10 correct song titles, they can take home the jackpot prize worth ₱500,000, and each player receives ₱20,000.

(50 players) Rules are the same as before. However, each correct song title is worth ₱10,000. Even so, if they guessed 10 correct song titles without consuming their entire jackpot time, they can take home the jackpot prize worth ₱1,000,000, and each player receives ₱20,000.

(75 players) Rules are the same as before. However, each correct song title is worth ₱15,000. Even so, if they guessed 10 correct song titles without consuming their entire jackpot time, they can take home the jackpot prize worth ₱1,500,000, and each player receives ₱20,000.

(100 players) Rules are the same as before. But since there are 100 players, each correct song title is worth ₱100,000. Even so, if they guessed 10 correct song titles without consuming their entire jackpot time, they can take home the jackpot prize worth ₱2,000,000, and each player receives ₱20,000.

Cast
Host
 Vice Ganda

Resident band
Six Part Invention
 Kaye Malana Cantong (Lead Vocalist)
 Rey Cantong (Lead Vocalist and Guitars)
 Tag Cantong (Drummer and Percussionist)
 Cookie Taylo (Bass)

 Guest Vocalists
Elha Nympha (Perya Performers Episode)
Jason Dy (Perya Performers Episode)
Erik Santos (Sales Agents Episode)
Klarisse de Guzman (Mangingisda Episode)
Darren Espanto (Dentists Episode)

Dancers
Vanessa Yap
Jewel Andrei Baldeo
Ciara Denise Cabayao
Ruth Paga
Dominique Mailloux
Angelica Madayag
Angela Brimner
Angelica Brimner
Chemylin Mae Magsino
Nikka Brillantes

Development and production
The Philippine game show was first revealed in early-2020 as an upcoming show, that was supposed to air in the same year as part of ABS-CBN original programming. It was also later revealed that the game show is set to premiere on March 15, 2020, on ABS-CBN, replacing Vice Ganda's late-night comedy talk show Gandang Gabi, Vice!; however, on March 13, 2020, Vice Ganda announced in Piling Lucky, a segment of It's Showtime, that the production of the game show is postponed, in addition to that, the game show's pilot episode on March 15, 2020, is cancelled due to safety and health concerns brought by the COVID-19 pandemic.

Promotion
Before the game show was pre-empted, Vice Ganda revealed in the final episode of Gandang Gabi, Vice! on March 8, 2020, that his late-night comedy talk show will now be replaced with his game show, Everybody Sing. On May 30, 2021, Vice Ganda appeared as a celebrity guest in the final episode of the third season of Your Face Sounds Familiar to promote his game show, that will replace the singing and impersonation competition.

Broadcast
The game show was aired for first season from June 5 to October 10, 2021 on Kapamilya Channel, and A2Z replacing the third season of Your Face Sounds Familiar and was replaced by Pinoy Big Brother: Kumunity Season 10. On February 28, 2022, Vice Ganda itself in his noontime show It's Showtime confirmed the second season of the program. The second season aired on September 24, 2022, replacing the second season of Idol Philippines. 

The game show is also available in global subscription television network, The Filipino Channel, and in online-streaming platforms, Kapamilya Online Live and iWantTFC.

Series overview

Episodes

As of February 5, 2023, the show had already aired a total of 76 episodes. This includes the first season, the 100 Songbayanan Special, and the second season.

Twelve (12) Songbayanan groups have already won the varied jackpot prize. Seven (7) groups had won the jackpot prize during the first season, while five (5) groups won the jackpot prize on the second season. These include the non-jackpot winners.

The first season of Everybody, Sing! had given away a total amount of nine million, thirty thousand pesos, (₱9,030,000.00) while the second season of the game show had given away a total amount of four million, eight hundred eighty thousand pesos, (₱4,880,000.00) within an overall total of thirteen million, nine hundred ten thousand pesos. (₱13,910,000.00)

100 Songbayanan Special
The show aired its original iteration of the series dubbed as the 100 Songbayanan Special after the 25 Perya Performers episode starting on September 25, 2021, and was aired for three consecutive weeks until October 10, 2021, in celebration for the finale of the first season. The episodes shown were taped before the COVID-19 pandemic and the ABS-CBN shutdown and legislative franchise denial. 

The game was originally played with five games, consisting of two rounds per game that were played by two different groups, whose each row is referred to as SONGpu, and the group that will play each game will be still randomly chosen by ChooSera. Once a group has been chosen to play a game, each correct lyric that a contestant gives will receive one-thousand pesos (₱1,000) if he or she sings his/her assigned line correctly (that will be also instantly given to them after their game) and adds one second to their jackpot timer. 

The first five (or in rare cases, six) rounds will be aired on a Saturday episode, while the remaining five (or four) rounds and the Jackpot round will be played on a Sunday episode.

Once all ten groups have played, the Songbayanan will then proceed to the Jackpot round, where all of them must accurately name ten song titles using their collected time from the preliminary rounds. The same mechanics are in place as with the modified version, where all contestants are only allowed to answer once. Once they have touched their individual buzzer to respond, they are unable to do so again.

One hundred thousand pesos (₱100,000) is given to the Songbayanan per every song title that they correctly guess. Just like the modified version, the basis for their take-home prize money will be multiplied to the number of their correct answers. For example, if a Songbayanan had only guessed 7 correct song titles, then they will only take home seven hundred thousand pesos (₱700,000) and each contestant will only receive seven thousand pesos (₱7,000) each. However, if the Songbayanan correctly guesses all ten song titles without fully consuming their jackpot timer, they will take home and divide equally the jackpot prize of two million pesos (₱2,000,000), with each individual receiving twenty thousand pesos (₱20,000) each.

The 100 Taal Survivors were the only group that took home and divided equally the two-million peso jackpot prize. Their episode was aired during the final week of the first season, which was on October 9–10, 2021.

Reception 
During the pilot episode of the game show on June 5, 2021, the episode received an 1.8% rating from AGB Nielsen Philippines, and the hashtag #EverybodySing became the top trending hashtag in Twitter nationwide. LionhearTV, an entertainment news website, wrote "ABS-CBN's new singing game show [Everybody Sing] is a blast of fun, excitement, and inspiration, as it unites Filipino communities and working groups from every walk of life." They also added, "There has been a bunch of game shows with similar formats, but this one differs in its unique motive to unite community groups, and by highlighting the undying ‘Bayanihan’ spirit."

Awards and nominations

See also
 List of programs broadcast by Kapamilya Channel

Footnotes

References

External links
 
 

2020s Philippine television series
2021 Philippine television series debuts
ABS-CBN original programming
Filipino-language television shows
Philippine game shows